A mashk (Hindi: मश्क) - (Urdu: مَشک) is a traditional water-carrying bag, usually made of waterproofed goat-skin, from North India, Pakistan and Nepal.
Mashqs can vary in size, from a hand-held bag, which was often used to carry liquids such as alcohol, to a large sized bag that comes with shoulder strap. They usually have only one narrowed opening. A person who is carrying a large mashk is called a māshqi (माश्क़ी, ماشکی). Traditionally, in the northern part of the South Asia, the larger mashq was associated with the Bhishti (भिश्ती, بهِشتی) subcaste who were employed as water-carriers by all other sections of society and often seen dispensing water (for a fee) in public places, gardens and construction sites.

Since water came as a great relief to people and plants during the hot summer in the northern Indian plains, the term Bhishti derives from the Persian root word bahishti, meaning heavenly.

See also

 Bhishti
 bota bag
 Goatskin (material)
 Matki (earthen pot)
 Ring sling
 Indian pottery
 Head-carrying
 Oven glove
 Pot-holder
 Trivet
 Tumpline

References

Containers
Indian culture
Pakistani culture